HMS Indefatigable, was a second-class  protected cruiser of the British Royal Navy. The ship was built by the London and Glasgow Shipbuilding Company of Glasgow between 1890 and 1892, launching on 12 March 1891. In 1910, the ship was renamed HMS Melpomene, and in 1913 was sold for scrap.

Design and construction
The Apollo-class were an enlarged version of the  built under the 1887–1888 shipbuilding programme.

Indefatigable was one of 10 ships of the class that were sheathed in wood and copper to reduce fouling when serving in tropical waters.

Two QF  guns were mounted fore and aft on the ship's centreline, while six 4.7 in (120 mm) guns were mounted three on each broadside. 8 six pounder guns and 1 three pounder provided protection against torpedo boats.

Indefatigable was laid down as Yard number 264 at London and Glasgow's Govan shipyard in 1890 and launched on 12 March 1891 and completed in 1892.

Service
From 1899 to 1903, Indefatigable served as part of the North America and West Indies Station, being recommissioned at Bermuda in January 1900. She was in Port of Spain in late 1902, when in December that year she was ordered to take part in an Anglo-German blockade of the coast of Venezuela during the Venezuelan crisis of 1902–1903.

In 1905, Indefatigable went into reserve at Portsmouth, recommissioning in January 1906 as part of the 4th Cruiser Squadron on the North America and West Indies Station. On 11 January 1910, she was renamed Melpomene, freeing up the name Indefatigable for a new battlecruiser. In May 1912, Melpomene was active off the coast of Mexico during the Mexican Revolution, and was reported to be about to land a force of Marines to protect British subjects.

Melpomene was employed in the Training Squadron from 1912 to 1913, and was sold for scrap to the shipbreakers Ward on 7 October 1913, at a price of £15,800.

Citations

Bibliography

 

 

Apollo-class cruisers
Ships built on the River Clyde
1891 ships